"La La La Love Song" is a song recorded by Japanese R&B singer Toshinobu Kubota for his ninth studio album, La La La Love Thang (1996). The song was written by Kubota and produced by Yoichiro Kakizaki.

Background

The song was credited under the name Toshinobu Kubota with Naomi Campbell. Naomi Campbell met Kubota in New York. The two would eventually work together in a collaboration.

The song became the theme song for the Fuji TV drama "Long Vacation". In September 1996, the song achieved million purchases and also became Kubota's first number one single on the Oricon singles chart. At week 6, the song achieved the number one spot on the Oricon Weekly Singles chart and remained on the charts for ten weeks. On December 10, 2011, the song charted at number 73 on Billboard Japan's Hot 100 chart. It is noted that "La La La Love Song" remains Kubota's signature song.

Music video
In 1996, Kubota shot a music video for the song. The video setting takes place in an empty club whereas Kubota and his band are playing and a waitress is cleaning up. Different video scenes from TV drama "Long Vacation" are used in the music video. The music video was contrasted to black and white, with the exception of video scenes from Long Vacation. It also noted that Naomi Campbell makes no physical appearance in the video.

Track listing
La La La Love Song (featuring Naomi Campbell)
What's The Wonder?
La La La Love Song (Instrumental)

Cover versions
 2002: Winnie Hsin recorded a Chinese version of the song, named "Long Vacation" (長假) in the album "Oh Lovers" (戀人啊).
 2004: BoA + SOUL'd OUT recorded the song for the Toshinobu Kubota tribute album "Soul Tree: A Musical Tribute to Toshinobu Kubota". The song was also included her greatest hits album Best of Soul.
 2004: Laura Fiji~i recorded the song for the "20 Jazz Greatest Hits Song Book" cover album in English.
 2005: Park Yong-Ha recorded the song for his extended play "Sometime".
 2007: Karen Gong performed a Malaysian version of the song, titled "Na Na Na Nada Cinta". The song was released on their album "Mulakan".
 2009: Daichi Miura performed the song in concert, which appears on his concert DVD "DAICHI MIURA LIVE 2009 -Encore of Our Love-".
 2010: Nokko covered the song, which featured KG, for her album, Kiss.
 2011: Exile recorded the song for limited edition cover album for "Tower of Wishes".
 2012: Beni recorded the song for her cover album "Covers".
 2012: Stevie Hoang recorded an English version of the song. The song was released on his album "All For You"
 2013: Ayaka recorded the song for her cover album "遊音俱楽部〜1st grade〜".
 2014: Unchain recorded the song for their cover album "Love & Groove Delivery Vol.2".
 2018: K-pop singer and former 15& member Yerin Baek recorded the song in Japanese, which can be heard on her Soundcloud page.
 2022: K-pop singer and NCT member Doyoung recorded the song in Japanese, which can be heard on his instagram @do0_nct.

Charts and certifications

Certifications

See also
List of best-selling singles in 1996 (Japan)

References

1996 singles
1996 songs
Japanese television drama theme songs
Oricon Weekly number-one singles
Toshinobu Kubota songs
Naomi Campbell songs
Songs written by Toshinobu Kubota
Sony Music Entertainment Japan singles